Jop van der Avert (born 11 May 2000) is a Dutch professional footballer player who plays as a defender for FC Dordrecht.

Career
Born in Bergen op Zoom, North Brabant, Van der Avert began playing football at an early age for local club MOC '17, before being scouted by NAC Breda via the youth department of RBC Roosendaal. In 2020, he signed his first professional contract with Willem II. He made his debut for on 20 September 2020, in a 4–0 home win over Heracles Almelo in the Eredivisie. He came on for Jordens Peters in the 85th minute.

On 26 July 2021, Van der Avert signed a two-year contract with Eerste Divisie club Dordrecht after a successful trial, in which he impressed in pre-season friendlies against ASWH and Almere City.

Career statistics

Club

References

2000 births
Living people
Sportspeople from Bergen op Zoom
Dutch footballers
Association football defenders
RBC Roosendaal players
NAC Breda players
Willem II (football club) players
FC Dordrecht players
Eredivisie players
Footballers from North Brabant